= How I Play Golf =

How I Play Golf may refer to:

- How I Play Golf, a 1931 short film series by Bobby Jones
- How I Play Golf, a 2001 book by Tiger Woods
